In shogi, Demon Slayer or Demon Killer (鬼殺し onigoroshi) is a trap opening initiated by Black that characteristically advances their left knight blocking their bishop's diagonal.

Later moves attempt an attack using a further advanced knight and also possibly against White's left silver.

If defended against properly by White, then it puts Black in an unfavorable position.  Therefore, it is designed to trap novice players.

Development

Defending against Demon Slayer

Demon Slayer can be defended against by moving White's right gold to 63.

New Demon Slayer

 (新鬼殺し shin oni koroshi) is a variation of the Demon Slayer opening.

See also
 Ranging Rook
 Shogi opening

References

Bibliography

External links
 YouTube HIDETCHI: Shogi Openings: Demon Killer
 Shogifan: Demon Killer

Shogi openings
Ranging Rook openings
Shogi surprise openings
Third File Rook openings